Seafarers' Welfare Convention, 1987 is  an International Labour Organization Convention.

It was established in 1987, with the preamble stating:
Having decided upon the adoption of certain proposals with regard to seafarers' welfare at sea and in port...

Ratifications 
As of 2022, the convention has been ratified by 18 states. However, 14 of the ratifying states have subsequently denounced the treaty automatically by ratifying the Maritime Labour Convention, 2006.

References

External links 
Text.
Ratifications.

International Labour Organization conventions
Treaties concluded in 1987
Treaties entered into force in 1990
Treaties of Brazil
Treaties of Czechoslovakia
Treaties of the Czech Republic
Treaties of Georgia (country)
Treaties of Guatemala
Treaties of the Hungarian People's Republic
Treaties of Mexico
Treaties of Romania
Treaties of Slovakia
Admiralty law treaties
1987 in labor relations